In mathematics, local duality may refer to:
Local Tate duality of modules over a Galois group of a local field
Grothendieck local duality of modules over local rings